Almería Airport  is an airport located  east of Almería city centre, in the province of Almería in Andalusia, Spain. It is close to the main tourist centers of the province such as the Cabo de Gata-Níjar Natural Park, El Ejido, Mojácar, Roquetas de Mar or Vera.

Facilities
It is a modern airport, with arrivals and departures taking place on the main ground floor. There is a terrace and a small cafe overlooking the runway.

Airlines and destinations
The following airlines operate regular scheduled and charter flights at Almería Airport:

Statistics

References

External links

Official website 

Airports in Andalusia
Buildings and structures in Almería
Airports established in 1968
1968 establishments in Spain